Ulriken (or the older, Ålreken) is the highest of the Seven Mountains that surround the city of Bergen, Norway. Ulriken has an aerial tramway, Ulriksbanen, that can bring people to the top. At the top there is a TV tower, a restaurant, and free telescopes. There is a network of trails along Ulriken, which is a popular hike with several paths up ranging from steep to not so steep.

History 
One of the slopes of Ulriken, known as Isdalen ("Ice Valley"), is also nicknamed "Death Valley", due to the area's history of suicides in the Middle Ages, and more recent hiking accidents. The valley became well known in 1970 when the remains of the mysterious Isdal Woman was discovered there. Another area of the mountain is called "Montana".

Ulriksbanen opened in 1961 and was closed in 1974 after an accident. The cable car closed again in the 1980s due to lack of funds, and again in January 2006, due to the operating company failing to meet government requirements for documentation, but it reopened later in the spring of the same year. It was later closed again, but it reopened for business on May 1, 2009.

The Ulriken Tunnel is a single-line railway tunnel on the Bergen Line between Bergen Station and Arna Station. A second tunnel, began in January 2016, is expected to be completed by 2020.

The mountain was featured in a 2016 music video by Alan Walker called Alone.

Media gallery

See also
List of mountains of Norway

References

External links
Ulriken Opp: Løypen [Ulriken up: the track]

Mountains of Bergen
Tourist attractions in Bergen